A hitching post is a post to which a horse (or other animal) may be tethered to prevent it from straying.  The term can also refer to:

 The "hitching post", a contentious punishment in the case of Hope v. Pelzer
 The Hitching Post, a steakhouse restaurant
 The Hitching Post, a pub in Ballycogley
 The Hitching Post, a student publication of Wilson High School (Los Angeles, California)
 The Hitching Post, a student publication of Marlboro High School
 Hitching Post Plaza in Perinton, New York
 Hitching Post Hill (Hyattsville, Maryland), a historic building in Hyattsville, Prince George's County, Maryland
 Hitchin' Posts, a lost 1920 drama film directed by John Ford

See also
 Hitchin